Luciana "Lucy" Fato (born 1966) is an American corporate attorney. She has been general counsel at AIG since October 2017.

Prior to joining AIG, her positions included nine years as deputy general counsel at Marsh & McLennan Companies, and a year as general counsel at McGraw Hill Financial (now S&P Global) settling high-profile securities-ratings lawsuits against Standard & Poor's Ratings Services from the Department of Justice, the Securities and Exchange Commission, and numerous state attorneys general.

Early life and education
Fato was born in Pittsburgh, Pennsylvania in 1966. She attended The Ellis School in Pittsburgh, graduating in 1984.

She received a BA in business and economics from the University of Pittsburgh in 1988, and a JD from the University of Pittsburgh School of Law in 1991.

Career

Davis Polk & Wardwell
Fato began her legal career in 1991 at the law firm Davis Polk & Wardwell in New York City. In 2000 she was elected a corporate partner in the capital markets department of the firm. She advised multinational companies on a range of corporate matters, and gained an increasing reputation as a problem solver capable of resolving high-profile government lawsuits.

Marsh & McLennan Companies
In September 2005, Fato was hired by Marsh & McLennan Companies (MMC) as Deputy General Counsel and Corporate Secretary. She was heavily involved in the sale of two former Marsh & McLennan businesses: Putnam Investments in 2007, and the Kroll corporate-intelligence unit in 2010. In addition, she helped reshape MMC's global legal department, overhauled the company's governance practices, and reduced legal operations expenses by more than 50%.

McGraw Hill Financial
In August 2014, Fato became executive vice president and general counsel of McGraw Hill Financial, whose brands included Standard & Poor's (S&P). At the time, S&P was dealing with several high-profile government lawsuits concerning its ratings of mortgage-backed securities prior to the financial crisis of 2007–2008. Fato immediately employed her skills in relationship-building and conciliation to resolve the lawsuits; on the morning of her first day as general counsel she phoned several government lawyers. Within six months she negotiated favorable global settlements with the Department of Justice, the Securities and Exchange Commission, and 22 state attorneys general.

She left McGraw Hill Financial in October 2015.

Nardello
In October 2016, Fato joined the global private investigative firm Nardello & Co, headquartered in New York, where she served in multiple roles, including managing director, head of the Americas, and global general counsel. During her time at Nardello she was credited with growing the firm's network and global culture of teamwork. When she left the firm in October 2017 she remained on Nardello's newly formed advisory board, to help guide it in its next phase of growth.

AIG
In October 2017, Fato became executive vice president and general counsel of AIG, succeeding Peter Solmssen. She was appointed by the new CEO of AIG, Brian Duperreault, who had been the CEO of Marsh & McLennan Companies during her tenure there. She was also AIG's interim head of human resources from October 2018 through July 2019.

At AIG, her duties as general counsel include overseeing global legal, compliance, and regulatory matters. She is also part of the company's executive leadership team and participates in all strategic and policy decisions regarding AIG's operations. In addition to overseeing legal, compliance, and regulatory matters for AIG, in 2021, she was tasked with responsibility for its government and public affairs, as well as communications. She reported directly to Duperreault, who was succeeded by chairman Peter Zaffino in January 2022.

Board memberships
In 2018 Fato was appointed for a three-year term to the New York State Insurance Advisory Board. She is also on the board of directors of the Life Insurance Council of New York.

She is on the advisory board of Nardello & Co., and is a cybersecurity group member of the Aspen Institute.

She is on the boards of directors of the Coalition for the Homeless and Advocates for Children of New York. She is also on the board of trustees of the Randall's Island Park Alliance and is a member of its executive committee.

Awards and honors
In 2009, Fato was inducted into the YWCA-NYC Academy of Women Leaders.

She was named one of Ethisphere Magazine'''s "Attorneys Who Matter" in 2015 and 2017. In 2017, the New York County Lawyers Association honored her as one of its Outstanding Women in the Legal Profession.

In 2018 and 2019 she was named by the National Association of Corporate Directors' NACD Directorship magazine as one of the Directorship 100, which recognizes the most influential people in corporate boardrooms. In 2019 she was named one of Crain's New York'''s Notable Women in Law, and she was one of three recipients of Legal Momentum's 19th annual Aiming High awards.

References

Living people
1966 births
Corporate lawyers
Lawyers from Pittsburgh
Lawyers from New York City
21st-century American lawyers
Davis Polk & Wardwell lawyers
American International Group people
The Ellis School alumni
University of Pittsburgh alumni
University of Pittsburgh School of Law alumni
21st-century American women lawyers